Boloria natazhati, the Beringian fritillary, cryptic fritillary or Pleistocene fritillary, is a butterfly of the family Nymphalidae. It is found from northwestern Canada as far south as northern British Columbia.

The wingspan is 32–44 mm. The butterfly flies from mid-June to July. It is found in a variety of habitats including screes, slopes, rocky ridges, and cobble beaches. 

The larvae possibly feed on Dryas integrifolia. Adults feed on flower nectar from Phlox sibirica and saxifraga species.

References

Boloria
Butterflies of North America
Insects of the Arctic
Butterflies described in 1920